Olaf Michael "Olemic" Thommessen (born 18 April 1956 in Lillehammer) is a Norwegian politician for the Conservative Party and the President of the Storting from 2013 until 2018. On 8 March 2018, he announced that he would step down due to controversies surrounding a building project for a new entrance to the garage for Stortinget. The project saw the initial budget ballooning and questionable decisions taken and Thommessen acknowledged his overall responsibility and said he would step down.

He was elected to the Norwegian Parliament from Oppland in 2001, and was re-elected on four occasions. He didn’t seek re-election in 2021. He previously served as a deputy representative during the term 1993–1997.

Thommessen was a member of Lillehammer municipality council from 1987 to 1995.

References

1956 births
Living people
Politicians from Lillehammer
Conservative Party (Norway) politicians
Presidents of the Storting
Members of the Storting
21st-century Norwegian politicians
Recipients of the Order of Prince Yaroslav the Wise, 2nd class